The 2015 New England Revolution season was the club's twentieth season of existence, and their twentieth in Major League Soccer, the top tier of the American soccer pyramid. The club enters the season as the defending Eastern Conference champions.

Outside of MLS regular season play, the club participated in the 2015 U.S. Open Cup.

Background

Review

Preseason

Off season Player Movement 
Immediately after losing the 2014 MLS Cup Final, the New England Revolution began making roster moves to improve the team for 2015. On December 8, 2014, just a day after the Cup Final, the Revolution traded Dimitry Imbongo and Geoffrey Castillion to the Colorado Rapids in exchange for goalkeeper Joe Nasco. On the same day, in preparation for the 2014 MLS Expansion Draft, the Revolution declined options on nine players, goalkeepers Larry Jackson, Joe Nasco and Luis Soffner, defender Jossimar Sanchez, midfielders Shalrie Joseph, Donnie Smith and Alec Sundly and forwards Andre Akpan and Tony Taylor, as well not extending a bona fide contract offer to defender Stephen McCarthy. The Revolution also completed trades with the two new franchises, New York City FC and Orlando City SC to ensure that Revolution Academy graduate Diego Fagundez was not selected in the Expansion Draft. During the draft, New York City FC selected Patrick Mullins and Tony Taylor in the second and fifth rounds, respectively. On December 18, 2014 New England traded their fourth-round pick in the 2015 MLS SuperDraft to Toronto FC in exchange for midfielder Jeremy Hall and selected Tristan Bowen in the 2014 MLS Re-Entry Draft. At the 2015 MLS SuperDraft, the Revolution traded their second-round pick to Seattle Sounders FC in exchange for Sean Okoli and used their own third-round pick to draft Cal State Fullerton forward Marc Fenelus. Midfielder Donnie Smith was re-signed by the club on January 23, staying with the team for a third year. 2013 starting forward Juan Agudelo on January 30.

Personnel

Roster 

As of August 26, 2015. Source: New England Revolution Roster

Technical staff

Player movement

In 

Per Major League Soccer and club policies terms of the deals do not get disclosed.

Out

Matches and results

Preseason

Desert Diamond Cup

MLS regular season

MLS Cup Playoffs

U.S. Open Cup

Fourth round

Tables

Eastern Conference

Overall table

Results summary

Results

Player information

Outfield player statistics

Goalkeeper statistics

Kits 

Like all Major League Soccer teams, the 2015 New England Revolution kits are produced by adidas. New England continue wearing the same home kits as in 2014, however the away kit, which was introduced at an event on March 3, broke from the traditional monochromatic white for away kits and featured a red shirt. United Healthcare continued their four-year relationship with the club as their jersey sponsor.

References 

New England Revolution seasons
New England Revolution
New England Revolution
New England Revolution
Sports competitions in Foxborough, Massachusetts